Darrel Williams (born April 15, 1995) is an American football running back for the Arizona Cardinals of the National Football League (NFL). He played college football at LSU. He was signed by the Kansas City Chiefs as an undrafted free agent in 2018.

High school career
Williams was a four-star recruit coming out of John Ehret High School in Marrero, Louisiana; he amassed 2,036 yards and had 27 touchdowns in his senior year. He had offers from Arizona State, Wisconsin, Tennessee, and Florida.

College career
In Williams's freshman season at LSU, he joined a four-player running back rotation. As a senior, he started in several games in place of an injured Derrius Guice. On October 21, 2017, against Ole Miss, he became the first player in LSU history to record at least 100 rushing yards and 100 receiving yards in the same game. After the conclusion of LSU's 2017 season, Williams accepted an invitation to play in the 2018 Senior Bowl.

Collegiate statistics

Professional career

Kansas City Chiefs
After going undrafted in the 2018 NFL Draft, Williams was signed by the Kansas City Chiefs as an undrafted free agent on May 5, 2018.

2018
Williams totaled 13 carries for 44 rushing yards and three receptions for 27 receiving yards and a receiving touchdown in his rookie season.

2019: Super Bowl championship
In Week 4 of the 2019 season against the Detroit Lions, Williams rushed eight times for 13 yards and two touchdowns and caught three passes for 43 yards in the 34–30 win. Williams was placed on injured reserve on December 5, 2019, with a hamstring injury. He finished the season with 141 rushing yards and three touchdowns, along with 15 catches for 167 yards and one touchdown through 12 games. During his absence, the Chiefs went on to win Super Bowl LIV, their first championship in 50 years.

2020

In the 2020 season, Williams finished the season with 39 carries for 169 rushing yards and one rushing touchdown to go along with 18 receptions for 116 receiving yards. He earned the start for the Divisional Round against the Cleveland Browns due to an injury to Clyde Edwards-Helaire. In the game, Williams rushed for 78 yards and caught 4 passes for 16 yards in the 22–17 win. In the AFC Championship against the Buffalo Bills, Williams rushed for 52 yards and a touchdown during the 38–24 win. He played in Super Bowl LV, but only recorded 15 total scrimmage yards in the 31–9 loss to the Tampa Bay Buccaneers.

2021
Williams signed a one-year contract extension with the Chiefs on March 16, 2021. Williams finished the 2021 season with a career high 558 rushing yards and six rushing touchdowns. He also caught 47 passes for 452 yards and two receiving touchdowns.

Arizona Cardinals
On May 31, 2022, Williams signed with the Arizona Cardinals on a one-year contract. He was placed on injured reserve on November 2. On November 14, 2022, backup running back Eno Benjamin was released, making Williams and rookie running back Keontay Ingram the backups.

NFL career statistics

Regular season

Postseason

References

External links 
LSU Tigers bio

1995 births
Living people
American football running backs
Arizona Cardinals players
John Ehret High School alumni
Kansas City Chiefs players
LSU Tigers football players
People from Marrero, Louisiana
Players of American football from Louisiana